Ezra J. William (born 7 September 1989) is an Indonesian socialite, fashion blogger, and television personality.

Early life and education 
Ezra J. William was born in Jakarta, Indonesia and grew up in Singapore, Los Angeles, and Hong Kong. He is the son of an Indonesian real estate mogul. He moved from Indonesia to the United States to attend New York University and lives in the West Village in Manhattan. He graduated from New York University with a degree in business with a concentration in marketing, advertising, and public relations.

Personal life 
William was a regular cast member on the American reality television series Rich Kids of Instagram. As a socialite, William has been referred to as part of the "Snap Pack", an elite group of New York City youth including Andrew Warren, Kyra Kennedy, Tiffany Trump, Reya Benitez, EJ Johnson, and Gaïa Jacquet-Matisse. He is also noted for his close friendships with Paris Hilton and Nicky Hilton Rothschild.

References 

Living people
1989 births
Fashion influencers
Indonesian bloggers
Indonesian socialites
Indonesian television personalities
Indonesian LGBT people
New York University alumni
Participants in American reality television series
People from Jakarta
People from Greenwich Village